Christina Chrysoula Tsoukala (born 8 July 1991) is a water polo player currently playing for Olympiacos and the Greece women's national water polo team.

She was part of the Greece national team awarded the gold medal at the 2011 World Aquatics Championships which took place in Shanghai in July 2011.

Biography
Christina is of Icelandic descent and she is the granddaughter of Kristín Guðmundsdóttir and Valsteinn Guðjónsson.
She speaks excellent Icelandic and tries to come to Iceland at least once every year.

See also
 List of world champions in women's water polo
 List of World Aquatics Championships medalists in water polo

References

External links
 

Greek female water polo players
Living people
Water polo players from Athens
1991 births
Olympiacos Women's Water Polo Team players
Water polo players at the 2008 Summer Olympics
Olympic water polo players of Greece
World Aquatics Championships medalists in water polo
21st-century Greek women